Hermann August Theodor Harms (16 July 1870 – 27 November 1942) was a German taxonomist and botanist. 

Harms was born in Berlin. He worked as a botanist at the Botanical Museum in Berlin. He was a member of the Prussian Academy of Sciences. He died in Berlin, aged 72.

He was longtime editor of Adolf Engler's "Das Pflanzenreich", and was the author of several chapters on various plant families in Engler and Prantl's "Die Natürlichen Pflanzenfamilien", including the chapters on Bromeliaceae (1930) and Nepenthaceae (1936). In the latter he revised the pitcher plant genus Nepenthes, dividing it into three subgenera: Anurosperma, Eunepenthes and Mesonepenthes (see Taxonomy of Nepenthes). Furthermore, he was interested in the genus Passiflora.

The plant genera Harmsia (Schum.), Harmsiella (Briq.), Harmsiodoxa  (in the Brassicaceae family) and Harmsiopanax  (in the  Araliaceae family) commemorate his name.

Publications 
 Genera siphonogamarum ad systematic Englerianum conscripta. Leipzig: G. Engelmann, 1900–1907, with Karl Wilhelm von Dalla Torre (1850-1928).
 Cucurbitaceae Cucurbiteae-Cucumerinae. Leipzig: Engelmann, 1924 (reprinted Wiley 1966), with Alfred Cogniaux (1841-1916).

References
 This article is based on a translation of an equivalent article at the German Wikipedia, namely: Robert Zander, Fritz Encke, Günther Buchheim, Siegmund Seybold (eds) Handbook of Plant Names . 13th Edition. Ulmer Verlag, Stuttgart 1984,  .

External links 
 
 Listing at IPNI
 WorldCat Titles (list of publications)

Botanists with author abbreviations
1870 births
1942 deaths
20th-century German botanists
Members of the Prussian Academy of Sciences
Scientists from Berlin
People from the Province of Brandenburg
German taxonomists
Members of the German Academy of Sciences Leopoldina